Scott Carrier is an American author, Peabody award-winning radio producer, and educator. He lives in Salt Lake City, Utah. His second book, Prisoner of Zion, was published in April 2013. He is a former assistant professor in the Department of Communication  at Utah Valley University.

Written work 

 Prisoner of Zion: Muslims, Mormons and Other Misadventures
 Running After Antelope
 "Over There" from The Best American Travel Writing 2003 originally featured in Harper's Magazine
 "Rock the Junta" from The Best American Nonrequired Reading 2007 originally featured in Mother Jones

Radio work 
Carrier's pieces have been featured on radio programs, including This American Life since 1996, The Savvy Traveler, Marketplace, Day to Day, All Things Considered, and NPR's Hearing Voices. In 2015, Carrier began producing a podcast entitled "Home of the Brave". The podcast combines original stories with work that previously aired on NPR and other radio shows.

Contributions to This American Life 
 Episode 12, segment The Moment Humans Stopped Being Animals, 1996 (rebroadcast in episode 49)
 Episode 21, segment Religious Faction, 1996
 Episode 35, Fall Clearance Stories, haiku stories, 1996
 Episode 37, segment The Test, 1996 (rebroadcast in episode 181)
 Episode 40, segment Swimming Lesson, 1996
 Episode 42, segment Finding Amnesia, 1996
 Episode 45, segment Whoring in Commercial Radio News, 1996 (rebroadcast as The Friendly Man in episode 181)
 Episode 48, segment Kids, 1997
 Episode 49, segment The Moment Humans Stopped Being Animals, 1997 (rebroadcast)
 Episode 53, segment Parent and Child, 1997
 Episode 64, segment On the Green River, 1997
 Episode 77, segment Kings, 1997
 Episode 80, segment Running After Antelope, 1997
 Episode 96, segment Book of Job, 1998
 Episode 113, segment Pot of Gold, 1998
 Episode 141, segment More Powerful Than a Locomotive, 1999
 Episode 146, segment Church of Latter Day Snakes, 1999
 Episode 181, The Friendly Man, with segments The Test (rebroadcast), The Friendly Man (rebroadcast), Who Am I? What Am I Doing Here?, and The Day Mom and Dad Fell in Love, 2001. Entire show rebroadcast April 24, 2009.
 Episode 191, segment Just Three Thousand More Miles to the Beach, 2001
 Episode 195, segment Are You Ready?, 2001
 Episode 241, segment No of Course I Know You, 2003
 Episode 243, segment The Hiker and the Cowman Should be Friends, 2003
 Episode 286, segment Invisible Girl, 2005
 Episode 333, segment Am not. Are too. Am not. Are too., 2007
 Episode 551, segment The Test., 2015

Awards
In 2006 Carrier won a Peabody Award for a story titled "Crossing Borders" which was aired on Hearing Voices on NPR.

In 2009 Carrier won a Fellow Award from United States Artists.

References

External links 
 Transom.org Bio
 Salon.com interview – May 21, 2001
 This American Life
 Transom.org blog post from Deep Wireless Festival – May 29, 2010
 Video interview with Scott Carrier on Transom.org – May 29, 2010
 Home of the Brave

21st-century American novelists
Utah Valley University faculty
Living people
American male novelists
American radio writers
Writers from Salt Lake City
21st-century American male writers
Novelists from Utah
Year of birth missing (living people)